The 1978 season was the Hawthorn Football Club's 54th season in the Victorian Football League and 77th overall. Hawthorn qualified for finals for the fifth consecutive season. Hawthorn qualified for their sixth Grand Final and first since 1976. Hawthorn won their fourth  VFL premiership defeating  in the Grand Final 121–103. This was their first premiership since 1976.

Fixture

Premiership season

Finals Series

Ladder

References

Hawthorn Football Club seasons